The Lake Quinault Douglas fir is an unnamed superlative Douglas fir on Lake Quinault in Olympic National Forest, Washington State. It was designated the champion of its species and the largest known Douglas fir in the United States by American Forests in 2018.

References

Grays Harbor County, Washington
Individual trees in Washington (state)
Individual Douglas firs
Olympic National Forest